Thomas Edward Flynn (6 January 1880 – 3 November 1961) was an English prelate who served as the Roman Catholic Bishop of Lancaster from 1939 to 1961.

Born in Portsmouth, he was ordained to the priesthood on 13 June 1908. He was appointed the Bishop of the Diocese of Lancaster by the Holy See on 12 June 1939. His consecration to the Episcopate took place on 24 July 1939, the principal consecrator was William Godfrey, Cardinal-Archbishop of Westminster, and the principal co-consecrators were Edward Myers, Coadjutor Archbishop of Westminster and Joseph McCormack, Bishop of Hexham and Newcastle.

He died in office at aged 81.

References 

1880 births
1961 deaths
Roman Catholic bishops of Lancaster
20th-century Roman Catholic bishops in England